The 1967–68 Balkans Cup was an edition of the Balkans Cup, a football competition for representative clubs from the Balkan states. It was contested by 6 teams and Beroe Stara Zagora won the competition.

Group A

Group B

Finals

First leg

Second leg

Beroe Stara Zagora won 6–4 on aggregate.

References

External links
RSSSF Archive → Balkans Cup

Mehmet Çelik. "Balkan Cup". Turkish Soccer

1967
1967–68 in European football
1968–69 in European football
1967–68 in Romanian football
1968–69 in Romanian football
1967–68 in Greek football
1968–69 in Greek football
1967–68 in Bulgarian football
1968–69 in Bulgarian football
1967–68 in Turkish football
1968–69 in Turkish football
1967–68 in Yugoslav football
1968–69 in Yugoslav football
1967–68 in Albanian football
1968–69 in Albanian football